Laura McNamara, known professionally as Lyra, is an Irish singer, songwriter and multi-instrumentalist.

Early life and musical development 
Lyra grew up in County Cork, Ireland. In an interview with the Irish Independent, she told of her early love of singing and performing. She has also said that her experiences singing in her church choir, and in speech and drama lessons were formational in the development of her singing. She has highlighted her love of Irish "luminaries" Enya and Sinéad O'Connor, artists whom critics, among others such as Kate Bush and Florence and the Machine, have subsequently likened her music to. Although she wishes to maintain a degree of mystery, she has confirmed that 'Lyra' is one of her given names.

Career 
Lyra released her first EP W.I.L.D on 15th July 2016, but gained most of her recognition following the featuring of "Emerald" on the second episode of the RTÉ drama Striking Out, and the subsequent featuring of her music. The same year, "Emerald" was also used in Teen Wolf, The X Factor and The Only Way Is Essex, and helped to gain her exposure.

She appeared on the 30th anniversary rework of U2's The Joshua Tree alongside other Irish artists Imelda May, Gavin James and Kodaline.

In 2017, Lyra signed a label deal with Polydor Records and Universal Music.

She has appeared at such festivals as the Great Escape, Music Cork, Latitude, and Electric Picnic.

Lyra has appeared as a guest performer on Dancing with the Stars and Ireland's Got Talent. Her song "Falling" was featured in the midseason finale of Season 16 of Grey's Anatomy, and on ITV's Love Island.

In 2020, her song New Day (a cover of an old Jackie Lomax song) was released as a single, after it was used in various TV-commercials in the UK (Sky Sports) and the Netherlands (bicycle manufacturer VanMoof).

In 2021, Lyra was announced as one of the judges on the Virgin Media One talent show, The Big Deal, joining Boy George, Aston Merrygold, Deirdre O'Kane and Jedward on the panel.

Lyra conducted an interview on LMFM on 3 October 2022 where it was revealed she has relations in Louth/Meath. Her Granmother Betty Duffy Castletown Co Meath. Her sister has the "Duffy hair" which Lyra says she did not get.
Her new single 29box was released on Friday 7th October 2022 and was played on LM/FM on 3rd October 2022.

Her latest single "You" was released on Friday 10th March 2023.

Discography

References 

Irish musicians
People from County Cork
Irish women singers
Irish pop singers
Living people
1993 births